Nightclub two step (NC2S, sometimes disco two step or California two step) is a partner dance initially developed by Buddy Schwimmer in the mid-1960s. The dance is also known as "Two Step" and was "one of the most popular forms of contemporary social dance" as a Disco Couples Dance in 1978. It is frequently danced to mid-tempo ballads in  time that have a characteristic quick-quick-slow beat. A classic example is the song Lady In Red.

Description
The nightclub two step basic step can be counted as one & two - three & four -.

The dance position for nightclub two step is with a more relaxed hold, or "what people tend to do without lessons". The lead rocks back on their left foot, the follow on their right, for one beat. "The toe is to the heel, but not further. Don't twist your hip. If your hip opens up, you have gone too far."
 A gentle but noticeable resistance is maintained during the rock step. Then both partners replace weight on the second part of the first beat. On the next beat, the lead takes a step to the left and the follow to the right.  Then both partners repeat, but on opposite feet (the lead rocks back on their right foot and moves to the right).

The quick rock steps should be matched with the quick drum beats in the music. The "slow" drum beat and slow step can occur on either the second and fourth, or the first and third beats of a measure. Although other rhythmic interpretations of the music are possible, including the use of "breaks" in the music, they are beyond the scope of this article.

Another pattern in NC2S is the side-cross-side move. Typically, the lead starts this move by stepping side with their left foot and then crosses in front with their right foot. This is followed by another step to the side with the left foot. The rhythm, here, is quick, quick, slow. The follow does the same thing, but starts with their right foot. Both partners cross in front. In an interview with Phil Seyer  Buddy said he created this move by modifying something that was popular in the 60's called the "Surfer Stomp." The surfer stomp was simply, side, together, side, touch. In the DVIDA Nightclub Two-Step syllabus, this action is called a Traveling Cross.

UCWDC lists a narrow range of 54-64 beats per minute for the dance.

References

Partner dance
Social dance